Hochries is a mountain in Bavaria, Germany.
It is 1569 m high, and is located in the north-western part of the Chiemgauer Alpen. The summit can be reached by cable car from Grainbach. Starting from the village, a chairlift takes you to the middle station at 920 m above sea level. From there, a cable car leads to the summit.

References

Mountains of Bavaria
Chiemgau Alps
Mountains of the Alps
Rosenheim (district)